Sakhi is a Marathi movie released on 16 May 2008. Produced by Lata Narvekar along with Bharti Achrekar and, directed by Sanjay Surkar.

Cast 

The cast includes 
Ashok Saraf as Suryankant Jagdale
Sonali Kulkarni as Nishi Surve
Subodh Bhave as Ravi Desai 
Usha Nadkarni as Kunda Tai & others

Soundtrack
The music is provided by Ashok Patki.

References

External links 
  Sakhi: Good one-time watch - rediff.com

2008 films
2000s Marathi-language films